Pretzel Park is a small park in the Manayunk section of Philadelphia, Pennsylvania. It was officially named Manayunk Park from its creation in 1929 until 2004, when it was renamed.  However, residents have referred to the park as Pretzel Park as far back as anyone can remember.

The park contains a partially fenced dog park.

Etymology
No one is quite sure where the name Pretzel Park originates.  Some believe that it is because of the pretzel shape of the walkways running through the park.  Others believe that the park took its name because a pretzel vendor used to sell Philly Pretzels in the park.

History
On November 28, 2005 a sculpture of a pretzel, about 6 feet tall including the base, was installed in the park.

Notes

External links
 Friends of Pretzel Park
 Manayunk Council - Pretzel Park

Northwest Philadelphia
Municipal parks in Philadelphia